Haislan Veranes Garcia (born March 4, 1983) is a Canadian freestyle wrestler. Competing in the 65–66 kg division, he participated in the 2008, 2012 and 2016 Olympics; he reached quarter-finals in 2012, losing to the eventual champion Tatsuhiro Yonemitsu. Garcia competed at six world championships, beginning in 2009, and placed fifth in 2010. In 2015 he won a bronze medal at the 2015 Pan American Games in Toronto. At the Pan American Championships he won silver medals in 2008 and 2009 and bronze medals in 2010 and 2011.

Garcia was born in Cuba and immigrated to Canada in 2004, following his father, mother and younger sister. He graduated from a military school in Cuba and has a son Harrison, who also competes in wrestling.

References

External links

 Wrestler bio on beijing2008.com

Living people
1983 births
Olympic wrestlers of Canada
Wrestlers at the 2008 Summer Olympics
Wrestlers at the 2012 Summer Olympics
Wrestlers at the 2016 Summer Olympics
Cuban emigrants to Canada
Canadian male sport wrestlers
Pan American Games bronze medalists for Canada
Pan American Games medalists in wrestling
Wrestlers at the 2015 Pan American Games
Black Canadian sportspeople
Medalists at the 2015 Pan American Games
20th-century Canadian people
21st-century Canadian people